Michael Ola (born April 19, 1988) is a former American football offensive tackle. He played college football at Hampton University and attended Riverdale High School in Riverdale, Georgia. He has also been a member of the Jacksonville Sharks, Montreal Alouettes, Miami Dolphins, Chicago Bears, San Diego Chargers, Detroit Lions, Seattle Seahawks, and New York Giants.

Professional career

Jacksonville Sharks
Ola was signed by the Jacksonville Sharks on March 3, 2012. He was released on June 11, 2012.

Montreal Alouettes
Ola signed with the Montreal Alouettes on June 10, 2012. He played for the Alouettes during the 2012 and 2013 CFL seasons.

Miami Dolphins
Ola was signed to a futures contract by the Miami Dolphins on February 7, 2014. He was released by the Dolphins on May 25, 2014.

Chicago Bears
Ola signed with the Chicago Bears on May 28, 2014. He made his NFL debut on September 7 against the Buffalo Bills, and made his first career start the following week against the San Francisco 49ers, replacing the injured Matt Slauson. In the 2014 season, he started at four of the five offensive line positions. Ola was released by the Bears on September 5, 2015.

San Diego Chargers
Ola was signed to the San Diego Chargers' practice squad on September 7, 2015. He was signed to the active roster on October 3, following the Chargers release of running back Donald Brown.

Detroit Lions
Ola was signed by the Detroit Lions on October 20, 2015. On September 3, 2016, he was waived by the Lions.

Seattle Seahawks
On September 13, 2016, Ola was signed to the Seahawks' practice squad. He was released on September 21, 2016.

New York Giants
On September 21, 2016, Ola was signed to the Giants' practice squad.

Buffalo Bills
On September 28, 2016, Ola was signed by the Bills off the Giants' practice squad. He was released by the Bills on October 25, 2016 and was re-signed to the practice squad two days later. He was promoted back to the active roster on December 13, 2016.

On September 2, 2017, Ola was waived/injured by the Bills and placed on injured reserve. He was released on September 6, 2017.

Los Angeles Chargers
On October 24, 2017, Ola signed with the Los Angeles Chargers.

New Orleans Saints
On May 14, 2018, Ola signed with the New Orleans Saints. He was released on September 12, 2018. He was re-signed on October 18, 2018. He suffered a high ankle sprain in Week 14 and was placed on injured reserve on December 11, 2018.

On February 19, 2019, Ola re-signed with the Saints. He was released on August 31, 2019. He was re-signed on December 6, 2019. He was released on December 28, 2019.

References

External links
Just Sports Stats
NFL Draft Scout
Chicago Bears bio

1988 births
Living people
People from Riverdale, Georgia
Sportspeople from the Atlanta metropolitan area
Players of American football from Georgia (U.S. state)
African-American players of American football
American football offensive tackles
Hampton Pirates football players
Jacksonville Sharks players
Miami Dolphins players
Chicago Bears players
San Diego Chargers players
Detroit Lions players
Seattle Seahawks players
New York Giants players
Buffalo Bills players
Los Angeles Chargers players
New Orleans Saints players
African-American players of Canadian football
Canadian football offensive linemen
Montreal Alouettes players
21st-century African-American sportspeople
20th-century African-American people